Protein IWS1 homolog also known as interacts with Spt6 (IWS1) is a protein that in humans is encoded by the IWS1 gene.

IWS1 is a transcription elongation factor. It was first identified during a search for RNA polymerase II-associated elongation factors in yeast; it directly interacts with RNA polymerase II (RNAPII) and is phosphorylated at casein kinase II (CKII) sites.

The human homolog, which physically interacts with protein arginine methyltransferase 5 (PRMT5), is essential for cell survival. It also recruits a SET2 histone methyltransferase (Huntingtin-interacting protein HYPB, also known as SETD2) to RNAPII during transcription elongation and is required for H3K36 trimethylation.

References

Further reading